Oskar Üpraus (12 October 1898 – 5 August 1968) was an Estonian footballer. He competed in the men's tournament at the 1924 Summer Olympics.

Besides football, he practised also skating, bandy and baseball.

References

External links
 

1898 births
1968 deaths
Estonian footballers
Estonia international footballers
Olympic footballers of Estonia
Footballers at the 1924 Summer Olympics
People from Keila
People from the Governorate of Estonia
Association football forwards
Estonian baseball players
Estonian bandy players